The RM-70 (Raketomet vzor 1970) multiple rocket launcher is a Czechoslovak Army version and heavier variant of the BM-21 Grad multiple rocket launcher, providing enhanced performance over its parent area-saturation rocket artillery system that was introduced in 1971 (the NATO designation is M1972).

Overview 

RM-70 was developed in Czechoslovakia as a successor for the RM-51, achieving initial operational capability with its Army in 1972. The launcher was being produced in Dubnica nad Váhom (Slovakia). Originally, it was sold to East Germany. After the Soviet Union collapse and the split of Czechoslovakia into the Czech Republic and Slovakia, it was sold to several countries in Africa, America, Asia and Europe.

RM-70 replaced the Ural-375D 6x6 truck by a Tatra T813 "Kolos" 8x8 truck as carrier platform for the 40-round launcher. The new carrier vehicle provides enough space for carrying 40 additional 122 mm rockets pack for reload. Nevertheless, RM-70 performance remains near the same as Grad even in terms of vehicle's speed and range. This rocket launcher can fire both individual rounds and volleys, principally by means of indirect fire. The fire is robust with almost 256 kg of explosives used in one volley of 40 rockets. The rockets used are either the original Soviet 9M22 and 9M28, or locally developed models. These are the JROF with a range of 20.75 km, the JROF-K with a range of 11 km, the "Trnovnik" with 63 HEAT-bomblets and a range of 17.5 km, the "Kuš" with five PPMI-S1 anti-personnel mines or the "Krizhna-R" with four PTMI-D anti-tank mines and a range of 19.45 km.

The vehicle is provided with a central tyre pressure regulation system (to allow its adaptation to the nature of the traversed ground), a headlight with white light on the forward cab roof and, if necessary, with a snow plough SSP 1000 or a dozer blade BZ-T to arrange its own emplacement or to remove obstacles.

Variants

Czech Republic and Slovakia
RM-70 - Basic model, as described.
 - Unarmored version of the RM-70, based on the Tatra T815 VPR9 8x8.1R truck with 265 hp engine T3-930-51. Combat weight: 26.1 t. Sometimes called RM-70M.
 - Modernised vehicle with new fire control and navigation equipment, can use a new type of rocket with a range of 36 km. Slovakia has ordered 50 upgrade packages.
 - In December 2000, the Slovak Ministry of Defense and Delta Defence started the RM-70 Modular German-Slovak modernization project. RM-70 Modular allows this artillery system to launch either twenty-eight 122mm rockets, or six 227mm rockets as used on the M270 MLRS. This way the system became fully NATO interoperable. The truck cabin is entirely armored. The Slovak Republic signed for 26 upgraded artillery systems with the first one delivered on May 20, 2005. RM-70 Modular is being offered as an upgrade for RM-70 owners.

Vz.92 "Križan" VMZ (velkokapacitní mobilní zatarasovač) - Engineer vehicle, based on the Tatra T815 36.265 with a lightly armoured cabin. The vehicle comes in different configurations, the standard being a 40-round rocket launcher (for "Kuš" and "Krizhna-R" rockets), a mechanical mine layer for anti-tank mines (PT Mi-U or PT Mi-Ba-III) and two dispensers for anti-personnel mines (PP Mi-S1).
 - Upgraded version with digital fire control. Tatra T-815-7 truck chassis powered by a Tatra T3C V8 engine with 270 kW of output, coupled with a Tatra 10 TS 210 N gearbox, with semi-automatic Tatra Norgen drive system and an additional gearbox Tatra 2.30TRS.

Operators

Current operators
 - 40 
 - RM-70 Vampire
 - 120 RM-70 

 - 6 RM-70 
 - 36 RM-70/85 (locally known as 122 RakH 89) former East German, delivered in 1991
 - 180 Upgraded RM-70 in service 
 -  158 RM-70 along with 205,000 122mm rockets from former East German Army stocks in the mid-1990s. 111 RM-70 
 - 9 acquired around 2003, 8 new RM-70 Vampir acquired in 2016
 - 36 (sold by Czechoslovakia between 1975-1976)
 - Unknown quantity, 2 confirmed delivered
 - Unknown number purchased from second-hand sources during the Cold War and domestically produced
 - 30 RM-70/85 . In 2018 unknown quantity RM-70 and BM-21 Grads sold to the Czech Republic and next donated to unknown North African countries (Libya ?)
 - 5 

 - 4 RM-70 and 26 RM-70/85 Modular 
 - 22 RM-70 
 - 6  
 - Unspecified number donated by Czech Republic in 2022

 - 60 RM-70

Former operators
 - 12 imported in 2009(reexport, not commissioned in the Bulgarian Army)
 - 60 RM-70 (decommissioned as of end of 2011 without replacement)
 - Passed on to the Czech Republic and Slovakia after its dissolution
 - 265 RM-70 and RM-70M; delivered to Greece after the collapse of East Germany. 36 sold to Finland in 1991.
 - Inherited from East Germany, donated to Greece.

See also 
 BM-21 Grad
 WR-40 Langusta
 T-122 Sakarya
 Fajr-5
 RS-122

References 

 
Deagel, RM-70 
Army Recognition, RM-70
Ministry of Defence of Czech Republic, Rocket Launcher 122 mm type 70

External links 
 Diehl BGT Defence RM-70 Modular
 RM-70 M1972 122mm MLRS Multiple Launch Rocket System on armyrecognition.com

Wheeled self-propelled rocket launchers
Multiple rocket launchers of Czechoslovakia
Military vehicles introduced in the 1970s
Self-propelled artillery of Czechoslovakia
Eight-wheeled vehicles